Thatsani Wichana (born 30 December 1988) is a track and road cyclist from Thailand. She represented her nation at the 2007 and 2009 UCI Road World Championships. She competed in the scratch event at the 2009 UCI Track Cycling World Championships.

References

External links
 Profile at cyclingarchives.com
 profile at Procyclingstats.com

1988 births
Thatsani Wichana
Living people
Place of birth missing (living people)
Southeast Asian Games medalists in cycling
Thatsani Wichana
Competitors at the 2007 Southeast Asian Games
Thatsani Wichana
Thatsani Wichana